is a Japanese greeting.

It may refer to:

 Hajimemashite (Miyuki Nakajima album), released in 1984
 Ā, Domo. Hajimemashite, a 2007 album by the Japanese band GReeeeN
 Hajimemashite, a one-time manga by Aoi Hiiragi
 “Hajimemashite”, a 2011 single by the Japanese girl-group LinQ
 “Hajimemashite”, a song on the 2002 album Live from the Lake Coast by Umphrey's McGee